The discography for Canadian country-pop singer Anne Murray includes 32 studio albums, 15 compilation albums and 76 singles. Murray has sold over 55 million records across the world, becoming one of the best-selling Canadian artists in history. She has scored 10 number one hits on Hot Country Songs and 8 number one hits on Adult Contemporary Chart.

According to Recording Industry Association of America, Murray has certified sales of 15.5 million records in the US. In 1987, she became the first female country artist to earn a triple platinum album. Murray was also the first Canadian female solo artist to score a number one hit on US Billboard charts.

Studio albums

1960s

1970s

1980s

1990s
{| class="wikitable plainrowheaders" style="text-align:center;"
|-
! rowspan="2" style="width:18em;"| Title
! rowspan="2" style="width:18em;"| Details
! colspan="5"| Peak chart positions
! rowspan="2"| Certifications(sales thresholds)
|- style="font-size:smaller;"
! width="45"| CAN Country
! width="45"| CAN
! width="45"| AUS<ref>Peaks in Australia during the 1990s:
 Croonin''': 
 Anne Murray: </ref>
! width="45"| US Country
! width="45"| US
|-
! scope="row"| You Will| 
 Release date: October 29, 1990
 Label: Capitol Records
| —
| —
| —
| 47
| —
| 
|-
! scope="row"| Yes I Do| 
 Release date: August 27, 1991
 Label: Liberty Records
| 23
| —
| —
| —
| —
| 
|-
! scope="row"| Croonin'| 
 Release date: November 2, 1993
 Label: EMI Music Canada/SBK
| 1
| 14
| 60
| 54
| —
| 
 CAN: Platinum
|-
! scope="row"| Anne Murray| 
 Release date: August 6, 1996
 Label: EMI Music Canada/SBK
| 10
| 48
| 6
| —
| —
| 
 CAN: Gold
|-
! scope="row"| What a Wonderful World| 
 Release date: October 19, 1999
 Label: StraightWay Records/EMI
| 6
| —
| —
| 4
| 38
| 
 CAN: Platinum
 US: Platinum
|-
| colspan="8" style="font-size:85%"| "—" denotes releases that did not chart
|}

2000s

Christmas albums

Compilation and live albums

Singles
1960s and 1970s

1980s

1990s and 2000s
{| class="wikitable plainrowheaders" style="text-align:center;"
|-
! rowspan="2"| Year
! rowspan="2" style="width:22em;"| Single
! colspan="4"| Peak chart positions
! rowspan="2"| Album
|- style=font-size:smaller;
! width="45"| CAN Country
! width="45"| CAN
! width="45"| CAN AC
! width="45"| US Country
|-
| rowspan="3"| 1990
! scope="row"| "I'd Fall in Love Tonight"
| 55
| —
| —
| —
| align="left"| Greatest Hits Volume II|-
! scope="row"| "Feed This Fire"
| 6
| —
| 2
| 5
| align="left" rowspan="4"| You Will|-
! scope="row"| "Bluebird"
| 3
| —
| —
| 39
|-
| rowspan="3"| 1991
! scope="row"| "New Way Out"
| 39
| —
| 16
| —
|-
! scope="row"| "You Will"
| —
| —
| —
| —
|-
! scope="row"| "Everyday"
| 56
| —
| 42
| 56
| align="left" rowspan="2"| Yes I Do|-
| 1992
! scope="row"| "I Can See Arkansas"
| 9
| —
| —
| —
|-
| 1993
! scope="row"| "Make Love to Me"
| 6
| 43
| 3
| —
| align="left" rowspan="3"| Croonin'|-
| rowspan="3"| 1994
! scope="row"| "The Wayward Wind"
| 7
| 70
| 6
| —
|-
! scope="row"| "Born to Be with You"
| —
| —
| 18
| —
|-
! scope="row"| "Over You"
| 29
| 85
| 11
| —
| align="left"| The Best...So Far|-
| rowspan="2"| 1996
! scope="row"| "What Would It Take" (with Bryan Adams)
| 49
| 28
| 7
| —
| align="left" rowspan="3"| Anne Murray|-
! scope="row"| "That's What My Love Is For" (with Aaron Neville)
| —
| —
| 15
| —
|-
| 1997
! scope="row"| "That's the Way It Goes"
| —
| —
| 19
| —
|-
| 1999
! scope="row"| "Let There Be Love" (with Dawn Langstroth)
| —
| —
| 23
| —
| rowspan="2" align="left"| What a Wonderful World|-
| 2000
! scope="row"| "What a Wonderful World"
| —
| —
| 42
| —
|-
| colspan="7" style="font-size:8pt"| "—" denotes releases that did not chart
|-
|}

Other singles
Singles with Glen Campbell

Guest singles

Charted B-sides

Videos and DVDsAnne Murray (1991)Anne Murray in Nova Scotia (1993)Anne Murray:  A Classic Christmas (1995)An Intimate Evening with Anne Murray (1997)Anne Murray:  What a Wonderful World (2001)Anne Murray in Jamaica (2005)

Music videos

BooksAnne Murray:  What a Wonderful World (2000) Balmur Book PublishingAnne Murray Centre Scrapbook (2000) Raincoast Books/Balmur PublishingAll of Me'' (2009) Knopf Canada  (autobiography)

Notes

References

Country music discographies
Discographies of Canadian artists
Pop music discographies
Discography